The 2004–05 season saw Benfica clinch the SuperLiga Galp Energia title after almost 11 years without the championship. The SuperLiga had one of the most competitive years, with both Braga and Boavista fighting for the title for a reasonable amount of time, closing the gap on the Big Three of Benfica, Porto and Sporting CP. The Big Three all managed to qualify for the 2005–06 UEFA Champions League, while Braga, Vitória de Guimarães and Vitória de Setúbal qualified for the 2005–06 UEFA Cup. Benfica did not manage to achieve the double, losing to Vitória de Setúbal in the 2004–05 Taça de Portugal final.

In the League of Honour, Paços de Ferreira won the title and alongside newcomers Naval 1º de Maio and former competitors Estrela da Amadora secured their place in the first level of Portuguese football for 2005–06.

In the UEFA competitions, the Portuguese teams qualified in the 2003–04 season were Porto and Benfica in the Champions League; Sporting CP, Braga, Martítimo and Nacional in the UEFA Cup; and União de Leiria in the 2003 UEFA Intertoto Cup. Early in the season, Porto lost the 2003 UEFA Super Cup to 2002–03 Champions League victors Milan. Porto would ultimately reach the round of 16 of the Champions League, where they were eliminated by Internazionale. In the middle of the season, Porto also won their second Intercontinental Cup against Once Caldas. Meanwhile, Sporting CP managed to reach the UEFA Cup Final (which was already chosen to be played at Sporting's Estádio José de Alvalade) where they lost to CSKA Moscow. The fact that Leiria reached the finals of the Intertoto Cup is also noteworthy.

Meanwhile, the Portugal national football team managed to secure a comfortable position that would prove decisive in the qualification for the FIFA World Cup 2006.

Honours

SuperLiga
After almost 11 years, the longest "drought" period in Benfica's history comes to an end. It was an "awkward" season, mainly due to the inconsistency of the perennial title candidates. Never a team had won the championship with such a small number of points since victories awarded three points. The 65 points of Benfica would only be sufficient to manage a fourth-place finish the year before and, considering a percentage of points awarded, their score of 64% would not have been enough to place them in first or second in any other of the previous Portuguese championships. Inconsistency was present in Benfica's season, but their main rivals were no better. In the upper part of the table, Braga's season was noteworthy: it was fighting for the title only four games before the end of the season.

Promoted teams
These teams were promoted from the League of Honour at the start of the season:
 Estoril (champion)
 Vitória de Setúbal (2nd placed)
 Penafiel (3rd placed)

Final standings

UEFA competitions and relegations
These teams were qualified for the UEFA competitions of 2005–06:
UEFA Champions League
Champions Benfica (group stage)
2nd placed Porto (group stage)
3rd placed Sporting CP (third qualifying round)
UEFA Cup
4th placed Braga (first round)
5th placed Vitória de Guimarães (first round)
Cup winner Vitória de Setúbal (first round)
These teams were relegated to the League of Honour at the end of the season:
Relegations
16th placed Moreirense
17th placed Estoril
18th placed Beira-Mar

Top scorers
1 Liédson (Sporting CP) 24
=2 João Tomás (Braga) 15
=2 Simão (Benfica) 15
4 Wesley (Penafiel) 14
5 Henry Antchouet (Belenenses) 12
=6 Albert Meyong (Vitória de Setúbal) 11
=6 Benni McCarthy (Porto) 11
8 Zé Manuel (Boavista) 10
=9 Roberto (Penafiel) 9
=9 Wender (Braga) 9
=9 Jorginho (Vitória de Setúbal) 9

UEFA competitions

UEFA Champions League

Porto
UEFA Champions League group H

UEFA Champions League round of 16

Benfica
UEFA Champions League third qualifying round

UEFA Cup first round

UEFA Cup group F

UEFA Cup round of 32

Sporting CP
UEFA Cup first round

UEFA Cup group D

UEFA Cup round of 32

UEFA Cup round of 16

UEFA Cup quarter-finals

UEFA Cup semi-finals

UEFA Cup final

Braga
UEFA Cup first round

Marítimo
UEFA Cup first round

Nacional
UEFA Cup first round

União de Leiria
UEFA Intertoto Cup third round

UEFA Intertoto Cup semi-finals

UEFA Intertoto Cup finals

European/South American Cup

UEFA Super Cup

Taça de Portugal
Vitória de Setúbal won their third Cup after beating Benfica 2–1 at the final played 29 May in the Estádio do Jamor. Simão scored first for Benfica, a penalty in the fifth minute, but an own goal by Ricardo Rocha in the 26th minute and another by Albert Meyong for Setúbal turned the game around.

Round of 16 to Final

League of Honour

Promoted teams
These teams were promoted from the Second Division B at the start of the season:
 Gondomar (North Zone champion)
 Espinho (Centre Zone champion)
 Olhanense (South Zone champion)

Final standings

Promotions and relegations
The following teams were promoted to the SuperLiga (future Liga betandwin.com) for 2005–06:
Promotions
Champions – Paços de Ferreira
2nd placed – Naval 1º de Maio
3rd – Estrela da Amadora
The following teams were relegated to the Second Division for 2005–06:
Relegations
11th placed – Felgueiras (due to economical problems)
13th placed – Alverca (due to economical problems)
18th placed – Espinho

Top scorers

Second Division B

Promoted and relegated teams

Final standings

Promotions and relegations

Top scorers

Third Division

Promoted and relegated teams

Final standings

Promotions and relegations

Top scorers

District championships

Portugal national team

KEY:  WCQ3 = World Cup Qualification match - Group 3; F = Friendly

 
Seasons in Portuguese football
Portuguese football
Football
Football